Suzanne A. Sisley is a psychiatrist and former clinical assistant professor at the University of Arizona College of Medicine. She was terminated from her position for her political activity, and her unethical involvement with a recall campaign against Arizona Senator Kimberly Yee in 2014. She is interested in research into potential medical uses of marijuana for profit through securing an FDA patent on its use, along with other natural remedies.

Marijuana research and termination
In March 2014, Sisley's proposal to study marijuana use to treat post-traumatic stress disorder (PTSD) was approved by the National Institute on Drug Abuse. After working at the University of Arizona for nearly eight years in various capacities, she was fired from the university in June 2014, ostensibly because of "funding and reorganization issues." Sisley, however, claims the firing was because of her interest in studying the potential medical uses of marijuana to treat PTSD. Sisley has also claimed that the university failed to provide a location for the trial to take place, and that the University of Arizona was "fearful of the word 'marijuana' and [did] not want... their brand aligned with this research." After she was terminated, the university released a statement saying that they had "not received political pressure to terminate any employee as has been suggested in some media and other reports."

Sisley has also acknowledged that she is "not sold" on the efficacy of marijuana for this purpose, but she does think cannabis use to treat PTSD has shown enough promise to be studied in a controlled environment. Since leaving the university, Sisley has continued her political activism throughout Arizona, the United States, and internationally - considered by many as a celebrity. 

 On July 28, 2014, the University of Arizona denied Sisley's appeal for reinstatement. In April 2016, the Drug Enforcement Administration approved Sisley's study, which is aimed at determining whether marijuana is an effective treatment for PTSD.

Dr. Sisley joined forces with her mother, Dr. Hanna Sisley, a family practice physician to develop a private practice / medical marijuana dispensary called White Mountain Health Center in Sun City, AZ, a suburb of Phoenix, AZ.

Dr. Sisley is currently President of Scottsdale Research Institute & Principal Investigator for FDA-approved randomized controlled trials examining safety/efficacy of smoked marijuana flower for treating pain, post traumatic stress disorder PTSD, and opioid substitution.

Sue is striving to put crucial medically-active plants/fungi thru entire FDA drug development process to eventually be available in the market as a safer alternative to synthetic pharmaceuticals. Scottsdale Research Institute in conjunction with their 501(c)(3) arm Field to Healed Foundation is collecting objective data hoping to urge health insurance companies to pay for whole plant botanical medicines similar to conventional pharmaceuticals.

References

University of Arizona faculty
Cannabis researchers
Living people
American women psychiatrists
American psychiatrists
Year of birth missing (living people)
American women academics
21st-century American women